The Indian Secular Front (abbreviation: ISF) is an Indian political party formed in West Bengal by Abbas Siddiqui, an influential cleric of the shrine of Furfura Sharif in Hooghly district.

History

This party was formed ahead of the West Bengal Assembly election of 2021 and joined the Sanjukta Morcha, led by the Left Front and the Indian National Congress against the Trinamool Congress and the Bharatiya Janata Party. The party contested the 2021 West Bengal Legislative Assembly election in 38 seats and won in 1 seat. The party fought the election under the borrowed symbol of Rashtriya Secular Majlis Party, a Bihar-based political party. After the election, Adhir Ranjan Chowdhury, the head of West Bengal Congress, declared an end to the alliance with Indian Secular Front.

Electoral performance
For the 2021 West Bengal Legislative Assembly election, the ISF allied with the Communist Party of India (Marxist) and Indian National Congress in an alliance named Sanjukta Morcha. Nawsad Siddique is the only MLA from the party.

References
 

 

Political parties in West Bengal
Political parties established in 2021
Islamic political parties in India 
2021 establishments in India
Politics of West Bengal